School Section Lake is a lake in Washington County, in the U.S. state of Minnesota.

School Section Lake was so named from its location in school section 36.

References

Lakes of Minnesota
Lakes of Washington County, Minnesota